Figure skating at the 1988 Winter Olympics took place at the Stampede Corral, the Olympic Saddledome and the Father David Bauer Olympic Arena in Calgary, Alberta, Canada. This would be the last Olympic competition where compulsory figures would be contested for the Men's and Ladies' events.

Medal table

Participating NOCs
Twenty-five nations sent figure skaters to compete in the events at Calgary.

Results

Men

Free skating final standings (top 8)

Referee:
  Sonia Bianchetti

Assistant Referee:
  Benjamin T. Wright

Judges:
  Elfriede Beyer
  Janet G. Allen
  Linda Petersen
  Alexander Vedenin
  Jacqueline Itschner
  Junko Hiramatsu
  Günter Teichmann
  Jean Matthews
  Gerhardt Bubník
  Maria Zuchowicz (substitute)

Ladies
Katarina Witt became the first woman to repeat as champion since Sonja Henie.

Free skating final standings (top 8)

Referee:
  Donald H. Gilchrist

Assistant Referee:
  Jürg Wilhelm

Judges:
  Peter Moser
  Lucy C. Brennan
  Sally-Anne Stapleford
  Kazuo Ohashi
  Reinhard Mirmseker
  Willi Wernz
  Sergei Kononykhin
  Dennis McFarlane
  Vera Spurná
  Monique Georgelin (substitute)

Pairs
During Watson and Oppegard's free skating, a photographer dropped his camera bag onto the ice and an usher walked onto the ice to pick it up while the pair was performing a death spiral on the other side of the rink.

Free skating final standings (top 8)

Referee:
  Elemér Terták

Assistant Referee:
  Walburga Grimm

Judges:
  Mikhail Drei
  Elfriede Beyer
  Claire W. Ferguson
  Sally-Anne Stapleford
  Suzanne Francis
  Shirley Taylor
  Gerhardt Bubník
  Günter Teichmann
  Maria Zuchowicz
  Junko Hiramatsu (substitute)

Ice dance

Free dance final standings (top 8)

Referee:
  Hans Kutschera

Assistant Referee:
  Alexander Gorshkov

Judges:
  Irina Absaliamova
  Ann Shaw
  Nancy Meiss
  Willi Wernz
  Cia Bordogna
  Heide Maritczak
  Roy Mason
  István Sugár
  Daniel de Paix de Coeur
  Maria Miller (substitute)

See also
 Battle of the Brians
 Battle of the Carmens

References

External links

 Official Olympic Report
 
 The Complete Book of the Winter Olympics by David Wallechinsky
 WINTER OLYMPICS : Orser Satisfied to Be Third After Figures; Boitano Second
 WINTER OLYMPICS : Women's Figure Skating : Thomas Is 2nd, Witt 3rd After Figures

 
1988 Winter Olympics events
1988
1988 in figure skating
International figure skating competitions hosted by Canada